Anthinus is a genus of air-breathing land snails, terrestrial pulmonate gastropod mollusks in the family Strophocheilidae.

Species 
Species within the genus Anthinus include:
 Anthinus henselii (Martens, 1868)

References

External links 
 Anthinus - ZipCodeZoo with image

Strophocheilidae